Schneckenhausen is a municipality in the district of Kaiserslautern, in Rhineland-Palatinate, western Germany.

Geography
Schneckenhausen lies 11 km (7 mi) north of Kaiserslautern at the spring of the Odenbach, which flows for around 22 km (14 mi) before joining the Glan River.  The community belongs to the Verbandsgemeinde (regional administrative body) Otterbach-Otterberg, which has its administrative offices in Otterberg. Along its outer borders lie the Wickelhof and Creutzhof farmsteads.

Politics
The municipal council is composed of 8 members who are elected locally through a plurality voting system.

Economy and infrastructure

The public transportation is integrated into the Rhein-Neckar Transit Network.  Two lines of the regional bus system connect the municipality to Kaiserslautern.  The nearest train station is located in Katzweiler roughly 7 km (4 mi) southwest.  The nearest Bundesstraße (Federal Highway) is B270, which runs parallel to the train tracks.

References

External links
Ortsgemeinde Schneckenhausen (German)
Area portrait of Schneckenhausen (German)

Kaiserslautern (district)